Coprosma foetidissima, commonly known as stinkwood or hūpiro, is a shrub native to New Zealand.

Coprosma foetidissima is found throughout New Zealand, from the coast to sub-alpine areas, including grassland and shrubland. Stinkwood is a dioecious plant, having both male and female plants. It flowers between August and October.

The plant was named stinkwood and foetidissima because of the foul smell produced when the leaves are crushed.

References

Flora of New Zealand
foetidissima